Hat Chapra King Edward High School is one of the oldest school in Nadia district. It is situated at Bangaljhi, Chapra, in the Indian state of West Bengal. The school is managed by the Department of School Education.

History 

King Edward High School was established in 1841 by the Church Missionary Society (CMS) of England as their part of mission initiated to spreading the missionary education in colonial Bengal.

References

Schools in Colonial India
High schools and secondary schools in West Bengal
Schools in Nadia district
Educational institutions established in 1841
1841 establishments in British India

External links